Tullio is a common Italian male given name of Latin origin, derived from Tullius (meaning "the one who leads"). Other forms of the name are Tulio (Spanish) and Túlio (Portuguese). It has a second meaning that is hill or valley of the hills. It may refer to:

Given name
Carlo Tullio Altan (1916–2005), Italian anthropologist, sociologist and philosopher
Tullio Altamura (born 1924), Italian film actor
Tullio Avoledo (born 1957), Italian novelist
Tullio Baraglia (1934–2017), Italian rower
Tullio Bozza (1891–1922), Italian fencer
Tullio Campagnolo (1901–1983), Italian racing cyclist and inventor
Tullio Carminati (1894–1971), Italian actor
Tullio Cianetti (1899–1976), Italian fascist politician
Tullio Crali (1910–2000), Italian artist
Tullio De Mauro (1932–2017), Italian linguist and politician
Tullio De Piscopo (born 1946), Italian drummer and singer
Tullio DeSantis (born 1948), American contemporary artist
Marco Tullio Giordana (born 1950), Italian screenwriter and film director
Tullio Gonnelli (1912–2005), Italian athlete
Tullio Ilomets (1921–2018), Estonian chemist and science historian 
Tullio Kezich (1928–2009), Italian film critic, playwright and actor
Tullio Lanese (born 1947), Italian football referee
Tullio Levi-Civita (1873–1941), Italian mathematician
Tullio Liberati (born  1968), American politician
Tullio Liblik (born 1964), Estonian businessman
Tullio Lombardo (1460–1532), Italian renaissance sculptor
Tullio Moneta (born 1937), South African actor
Tullio Pandolfini (1914–1999), Italian water polo player
Tullio Pinelli (1908–2009), Italian screenwriter
Tullio Regge (1931–2014), Italian physicist
Tullio Serafin (1878–1968), Italian conductor
Mark Tullio Strukelj (born 1962), Italian footballer
Tullio Tamburini (1892–1957), Italian soldier and fascist official

Other uses
Tullio phenomenon, auditory phenomenon named after the Italian biologist Pietro Tullio
Louis J. Tullio Arena, sports arena in Erie, Pennsylvania, named after mayor Louis J. Tullio
Pro Tullio, a 71 BC judicial speech by the Roman writer Cicero

See also
Tullius
Tulio

Italian masculine given names